Ed Quirk (born 28 August 1991 in Brisbane, Australia) is a rugby union footballer who plays professionally for the Japanese team, the . He usually plays as a blindside flanker.

Quirk attended Iona College before moving to Brisbane State High School in Brisbane, Queensland where he was a member of the school's First XV rugby union side. He graduated from State High in 2008.

He made his debut with Queensland Reds during the 2010 Super 14 season against the Hurricanes in Brisbane. In 2015 he also played for Queensland Country in the National Rugby Championship.

Quirk was a member of the Australia under 20 team that competed in the 2011 IRB Junior World Championship.

Reference List

External links 
 Reds profile
 Rugby Australia profile

1991 births
Australian rugby union players
Rugby union players from Brisbane
Queensland Reds players
Rugby union flankers
People from Brisbane
People educated at Brisbane State High School
Living people
Queensland Country (NRC team) players
Australian expatriate rugby union players
Australian expatriate sportspeople in Japan
Expatriate rugby union players in Japan
Sunwolves players
Chugoku Red Regulions players
Rugby union number eights
Yokohama Canon Eagles players